Thorkild Thyrring  (born 24 October 1946) is a Danish auto racing driver. He drove several times in the Le Mans 24 hour race, most recently in 2005 and 2006 for Sebah Automotive Ltd in a Porsche 911 GT3. His best result in the race was finishing nineteenth overall in 2005. Previously he raced a Lotus in 1993 and 1994 and a Corvette in 1995. His team had failed to finish the race in all of these previous attempts.

He competed in the 1992 British Touring Car Championship for the works Toyota Team, but was dropped after half a season due to poor results, finishing in seventeenth place. He has also raced in the Danish Touring Car Championship in 2000 with a Nissan Primera. He won three British GT Championship titles between 1993 and 1995.

Racing record

Complete British Touring Car Championship results
(key) (Races in bold indicate pole position) (Races in italics indicate fastest lap)

Complete 24 Hours of Le Mans results

Reference list

1946 births
Living people
British Touring Car Championship drivers
Danish racing drivers
24 Hours of Le Mans drivers
Danish Touring Car Championship drivers
European Le Mans Series drivers
World Sportscar Championship drivers

He is still the most winning danish racedriver till this date, all wins from Denmark and the rest of the world added together.